Greatest Hits Volume III is the third compilation album by American country music duo The Bellamy Brothers. It was released in 1989 via MCA and Curb Records. The album includes the singles "Hillbilly Hell", "You'll Never Be Sorry" and "The Center of My Universe".

Track listing

Chart performance

References

1989 compilation albums
The Bellamy Brothers albums
Albums produced by Jimmy Bowen
Albums produced by Tony Brown (record producer)
Albums produced by Emory Gordy Jr.
Albums produced by James Stroud
MCA Records compilation albums
Curb Records compilation albums